Czarna Dolna  ( Chorna Dolishnia) is a village in the administrative district of Gmina Czarna, within Bieszczady County, Subcarpathian Voivodeship, in south-eastern Poland, close to the border with Ukraine.

The village has a population of 420.

References

Czarna Dolna